Air Commodore Leon Victor Lachal, CBE (18 May 1904 – 12 March 1983) was a senior commander in the Royal Australian Air Force (RAAF).

|-

1904 births
1983 deaths
Australian aviators
Commanders of the Order of the British Empire
Military personnel from Melbourne
People educated at Parade College
Royal Australian Air Force officers
Royal Australian Air Force personnel of World War II
People from Abbotsford, Victoria